Distremocephalus texanus, the little Texas glowworm, is a species of glowworm beetle in the family Phengodidae. It is found in Central America and North America.

References

Further reading

 

Phengodidae
Bioluminescent insects
Articles created by Qbugbot
Beetles described in 1874